Darlington's Madang tree frog (Litoria darlingtoni) is a species of frog in the subfamily Pelodryadinae. It is endemic to Papua New Guinea. Its natural habitats are subtropical or tropical high-altitude shrubland, intermittent freshwater marshes, heavily degraded former forest, water storage areas, and aquaculture ponds.

References

Litoria
Amphibians of Papua New Guinea
Amphibians described in 1945
Taxonomy articles created by Polbot